The Ringstraße is a semi-circular, some 3 km long urban boulevard in the centre of Wiesbaden and the city's busiest and most prominent street system. The Ringstraße is a four up to six lane street and part of Bundesstraße 54. It encircles the old town of Wiesbaden on its southern and western boundaries.

Sections 
The Ringstraße consists of three sections (referred to as Ringe), individually named after personalities of German history.

Gustav-Stresemann-Ring 
The Gustav-Stresemann-Ring is the southern end of the Ringstraße and is named after Gustav Stresemann, a German politician and statesman who served as Chancellor and Foreign Minister during the Weimar Republic. Gustav-Stresemann-Ring is some 950 metres long and joins the southern intersections with the Frankfurter Straße, New York Straße and the Berliner Straße, which leads as a dual carriage way to the Bundesautobahn 66.

 Statistisches Bundesamt
 Wiesbaden Central Station

Kaiser-Friedrich-Ring 
The Kaiser-Friedrich-Ring is a wide, landscaped Avenue, with a central lawn and several lines of trees. This 1.4 kilometres long portion of the Ringstraße, 40 metres wide, is one of the road's widest sections. The Kaiser-Friedrich-Ring is named after the German emperor Friedrich III.

Bismarckring 
At a length of 500 metres, the Bismarckring is the shortest sections of the Ringstraße. The name of the Bismarckring pays tribute to the Prussian-German statesman Otto von Bismarck whose actions fostered the  unification Germany. The landscape is similar to the Kaiser-Friedrich-Ring section.

The Ringstraße ends at the square Sedanplatz.

Streets in Wiesbaden